Corwin is a surname. Notable people with the surname include:

Al Corwin (1926–2003), American Major League Baseball pitcher
Amber Corwin (born 1978), American figure skater
Betty Corwin (1920–2019), American theater archivist
Charlie Corwin, American TV and film producer
Daniel Lee Corwin (1958–1998), American serial killer
Edward Henry Lewinski Corwin  (1885–1953), American author of historical books
Edward Samuel Corwin (1878–1963), U.S. law professor
Edward Tanjore Corwin (1834–1914), US writer and historian of the Reformed Dutch church
Franklin Corwin (1818–1879), U.S. Representative from Illinois
George Corwin (1666–1696), High Sheriff of Essex County, Massachusetts, during the Salem witch trials
Henri Max Corwin (1903–1962), Dutch businessman, philatelist and humanitarian who protected Jews during World War II
Jane Corwin (born 1964) Republican nominee for U.S. Congress
Jeff Corwin (born 1967), television show host on Animal Planet
John A. Corwin (1818–1863), American politician and Ohio Supreme Court justice
Jonathan Corwin (1640–1718), New England merchant, politician and one of the judges in the Salem witch trials
Matthias Corwin (1761–1829), American politician
Morena Corwin (born 1969), Playboy playmate
Moses Bledso Corwin (1790–1872), U.S. Representative from Ohio
Norman Corwin (1910–2011), American writer and producer
Thomas Corwin (1794–1865), U.S. Representative and Senator from Ohio